Mosterøy is a former municipality in Rogaland county, Norway.  The administrative centre was the village of Askje where the Askje Church is located.  The   municipality existed from 1884 until 1965. The island municipality included the islands of Mosterøy, Klosterøy, Fjøløy, Sokn, Bru, and the western half of Åmøy.  Today, Mosterøy is part of the municipality of Stavanger.

The Utstein Abbey, the best-preserved medieval monastery in Norway, is located on the island of Klosterøy.  It was one of the most notable historic sites in the municipality.

History
The municipality of Mosterøy was established on 1 July 1884 when it was split off from the large island municipality of Rennesøy. Initially, the new municipality had a population of 1,309. On 1 January 1923, the westernmost group of outlying islands of Kvitsøy were separated from Mosterøy to form a separate municipality Kvitsøy. The split left Mosterøy with 745 inhabitants. On 1 January 1965, many municipal mergers took place in Norway due to the recommendations of the Schei Committee. On that date, Mosterøy was merged back into the municipality of Rennesøy. Prior to the merger, Mosterøy had a population of 817.

Government
All municipalities in Norway, including Mosterøy, are responsible for primary education (through 10th grade), outpatient health services, senior citizen services, unemployment and other social services, zoning, economic development, and municipal roads.  The municipality is governed by a municipal council of elected representatives, which in turn elects a mayor.

Municipal council
The municipal council  of Mosterøy was made up of 13 representatives that were elected to four year terms.  The party breakdown of the final municipal council was as follows:

See also
List of former municipalities of Norway

References

Stavanger
Former municipalities of Norway
1884 establishments in Norway
1965 disestablishments in Norway